Bandini  (English: Captured Female) is an Indian soap opera produced by Ekta Kapoor of Balaji Telefilms. It starred Ronit Roy, Aasiya Kazi, Mrunal Jain, Leena Jumani, Shardul Pandit and Kunal Thakkur and was set against the backdrop of Gujarat in Dharampur a village near Surat in Gujarat. The show premiered on 19 January 2009 and ended on 29 January 2011 on NDTV Imagine.

Plot
Santu Waghela is a poor but spirited girl who lives in the village of Dharampur with her maternal grandfather, Madhav Solanki, an experienced diamond cutter working for the middle-aged diamond merchant Dharamraj Mahiyavanshi. As an incentive to his best worker, Dharamraj offers to arrange and sponsor Madhav's granddaughter's marriage. Hours before the wedding, the bridegroom backs out and Madhav's fellow workers get agitated. Dharamraj, a widower, comes forward to marry the bride, Santu. For Dharamraj, the decision to marry Santu is purely a business calculation for appeasing his workforce. Dharamraj is still in love with his dead wife Subhadra, who has left him with 5 children: Hiten, Kadambari a.k.a. Kaddu, Maulik, Birwa and Suraj. Once home, he ignores Santu and she is constantly abused by his older sister, Tarulata a.k.a. Taru. In the meantime Kaddu and Shashank gets married.  After a long time, however, Dharamraj and most of his family members accept Santu as a member of the Mahiyavanshi family. Hiten and Khemi fell in love with each other and decided to get married. But in order to save her sister's relationship Khemi steps out of house and gets married to another guy name Arjan.It is revealed that Maulik is son of Tarulata and Kanji Wagehla and the son of Dharamraj died in an accident. After sometime Dharamraj finds that Arjan is his long lost son who was believed to be dead before. Khemi gets pregnant with Arjan's child. Soon Arjan reunites with family along with Khemi. Hiten and Toral also got married. Maulik started instigating Arjan against Hiten and Khemi relationship. He makes Arjan believes that Khemi is pregnant with Hiten's child and instigates him to kill Hiten. He intoxicates Arjan and in fit of rage and anger Arjan accidentally assaults Dharamraj. Birwa, trying to save her father, accidentally kills Arjan. To save Birwa, Santu takes the blame for the murder and goes to jail.

After 10 years

After 10 years Santu returns from prison. The Mahiyavanshis don't want her. Everyone in the Mahiyavanshi house is pretending to live happily. But Santu forces her way into the house, takes charge and starts many quarrels among family members. This brings many hidden problems to light. Dharamraj has shut himself away in a room and stopped mixing with people. But Santu with her love and honesty once again wins Dharamraj's love and family gets reunited. A woman named Megha comes forward with her son, Vishal and she claims that Dharamraj is the father of this boy. To everyone's surprise, medical tests prove that Vishal is actually Dharamraj's son. However, Dharamraj denies having any relationship with Megha. Then Santu discovers that Vishal is her own son, who was born while she was in prison. Megha had stolen Vishal from the jail hospital and Santu had been told that the baby was dead. Santu and Dharamraj reunite. Vishal comes to stay with Dharamraj and Santu, but Megha kidnaps him again.

After 16 years

After 16 years, Dharamraj's grandchildren have grown up. Santu is still waiting for her son Vishal to come home. After an extensive search, Vishal is found. He seems to be a good person, but this is just a mask. Megha has poisoned his mind against the Mahiyavanshis. He wants to separate Dharamraj and Santu. Dharamraj and Hiten, on finding out the truth, chase Vishal out of the house. Santu is shocked and becomes ill. Dharamraj is forced to take Santu to Vishal's house. But Vishal is exposed. Disillusioned, Santu comes back to the Mahiyavanshi house. Then Megha reappears and uses Vishal to get back at the Mahiyavanshi family. Vishal forces Dharamraj and Santu to leave the house. They go and live in Mumbai, where Dharamraj starts a new diamond business. After some time, they return to Dharampur. Meanwhile, Vishal has changed for the better. He realizes that Megha has used him as a pawn. He apologizes to his parents. Santu and Dharamraj forgive Vishal when they see that his regret is genuine. Santu finds out that she is pregnant once again. The whole Mahiyavanshi family is happy together.

Cast

Main
 Ronit Roy as Dharamraj Shakti Singh Mahiyavanshi: Santu's husband; Subadhra's widower; Arjan, Hiten, Kadambari, Birwa, Suraj and Vishal's father; Maulik's maternal uncle, Tarulata's brother.(2009–11)
 Aasiya Kazi as Santu Dharamraj Mahiyavanshi: Dharamraj's wife; Madhav's grand daughter; Khemi's sister; Vishal's mother; Arjan, Hiten, Kadambari, Birwa and Suraj's step-mother, Maulik's maternal aunt(2009–11)
 Mrunal Jain as Hiten Dharamraj Mahiyavanshi: Dharamraj and Subhadrason, Arjan, Kaddu, Birwa, Sooraj and Vishal's brother. Santu's stepson, Toral husband, Rishabh and Nakul's father. (2009–11)
 Kunal Thakkur as Arjan Dharamraj Mahiyavanshi: Dharamraj and Subhadra'son, Hiten, Kaddu, Birwa, Sooraj and Vishal's brother, Santu's stepson, Khemi's husband and Krishna's father (dead) (2009–10)
 Leena Jumani as Khemi Arjan Mahiyavanshi: Madhav's granddaughter, Santu's sister, Arjan's wife and Krishna's mother.(2009–10)

Recurring
Sameer Khakhar as Saurabh Bhai(2009–10)
Tarla Joshi as Vasudha Ben (2009–11)
 Rasika Joshi as Tarulata Kanji Waghela(2009–11)
Riddhi Nayak / Vibhuti Thakur as Toral Hiten Mahiyavanshi(2009–11)
Shardul Pandit as Maulik Kanji Waghela(dead)(2009–10)
 Prerna Wanvari as Kadambari Shashank Mehta(2009–11)
 Bharat Chawda as Shashank Rasik Mehta(2009–11)
Kimberly Jain / Hritu Dudani as Birwa Vanraj Gohli:Vanraj's wife (2009–10)/2010
 Jatin Shah as Sarang Vanraj Gohil (2010)
 Yash Dasgupta as Suraj Dharamraj Mahiyavanshi(2009–11)
 Ali Merchant / Shailesh Gulabani as Vishal Dharamraj Mahiyavanshi(2010–11)
 Monika Singh as Meghna Rasik Mehta(2009)
Avinash Sahijwani as Rasik Mehta(2009)
Surendra Rajan as Madhav Solanki(2009–11)
 Abigail Jain/ Akshita Rajput as Mongi Waghela
Sarita Shivaskar as Champakali(2009–10)/2010
 Prashant Narayanan as Kanji Waghela(2009)
 Chhavi Mittal as Subhadra Dharamraj Mahiyavanshi(dead)  / Anamika Desai(2009)
 Firdaus Dadi as Megha Mehra(2010–11)
 Akshay Anand as Manish Sabharwal(2010)
 Sumeet Sachdev as Rudra(2010–11)
 Karan Sharma as Krishna Arjan Mahiyavanshi(2010–11)
 Mohit Raina as Rishabh Hiten Mahiyavanshi(2010–11)
Yash Choudhary as Nakul Hiten Mahiyavanshi(2010–11)
 Ashish Kapoor as Vikram Suraj Mahiyavanshi(2010–11)
 Megha Israni as Nandini Shashank Mehta(2010)
 Micckie Dudaaney as Danish Shashank Mehta(2010–11)
 Rithvik Dhanjani as Parth Shashank Mehta(2010–11)
 Jia Mustafa as Triveni Vishal Mahiyavanshi(2010–11)
Dharmesh Vyas as Virat Sanghavi(2010)
 Maya Alagh as Surekha Virat Sanghavi(2010)
 Gaurav Nanda as Tehsildar(2010)
 Rajat Tokas as Lord Krishna(2010)

Production
After the exit of directors Santaram Verma later replaced by Kaushik Ghatak, the main lead Ronit Roy himself directed the series for few episodes.

In June 2010, Leena Jumani playing Kheemi quit as she was unhappy with the shaping of her character.

The series was inspired from the 1974 Gujarati novel Retpankhi of Varsha Adalja. However, with the production house not having paid the due for it, Adalja filed a complaint at The Film Writers Association and got her payment of ₹ 7.5 Lakhs after two years of the series premiere in 2011.

Balaji Telefilms made a series in 2020 on Colors as Molkki with the story under the lines of the series.

References

External links
 Bandini

Balaji Telefilms television series
Indian television soap operas
2009 Indian television series debuts
2011 Indian television series endings
Imagine TV original programming
Television shows set in Gujarat
Colors Rishtey original programming